Joseph-Siffred Duplessis (22 September 1725 – 1 April 1802) was a French painter known for the clarity and immediacy of his portraits.

Early life
He was born in Carpentras, near Avignon, into a family with an artistic bent and received his first training from his father, a surgeon and talented amateur. He subsequently studied with Joseph Gabriel Imbert (1666–1749), who had been a pupil of Charles Le Brun. From 1744–47 or later he worked in Rome, in the atelier of Pierre Subleyras (1699–1749), who was also from the south of France. In Italy Duplessis became fast friends with Joseph Vernet, another Provençal speaking Occitania.

Career
Duplessis returned to Carpentras, spent a brief time in Lyon then arrived about 1752 in Paris, where he was accepted into the Académie de Saint-Luc and exhibited some portraits, which were now his specialty, in 1764, but did not achieve much notice until his exhibition of ten paintings at the Paris salon of 1769, very well received and selected for special notice by Denis Diderot; the Académie de peinture et de sculpture accepted him in the category of portraitist, considered a lesser category at the time. He continued to exhibit at the  Paris salons, both finished paintings and sketches, until 1791, and once more, in 1801.

His portrait of the Dauphine in 1771 and his appointment as a peintre du Roi assured his success: most of his surviving portraits date from the 1770s and 1780s. He received privileged lodgings in the Galeries du Louvre. In the Revolution, he withdrew to safe obscurity at Carpentras during the Reign of Terror. Afterwards, from 1796, he served as curator at the newly founded museum formed at Versailles, so recently emptied of its furnishings at the Revolutionary sales. His uncompromising self-portrait at this time of his life is at Versailles, where he died.  The rue Joseph Duplessis in Magnac-sur-Touvre is named after him.

Work
 Duplessis would adjust his style to the social condition of his sitter: his portrait of Charles-Claude, comte d'Angiviller, director of the Bâtiments du Roi, is as distant and conventional as his state portrait of Louis XVI in coronation robes (1776), while his realistic and intimate portrait of the opera composer Christoph Willibald Gluck (Kunsthistorisches Museum, Vienna) catches the composer at the keyboard in a moment of inspiration and his penetrating portrait of the sculptor Christophe Gabriel Allegrain (Louvre Museum, illustration) shows him having just laid down his chisel: this was the morceau de reception that gained him admittance to the Académie.

His portrait of Benjamin Franklin (circa 1785), more than any other, has fixed the image of Franklin for posterity since it is reproduced on the U.S. hundred dollar bill. His portrait of the financier Jacques Necker hung at Voltaire's Coppet Castle. Several reduced versions were made, one of which is at the Louvre. Many of his portraits received a wider circulation as engravings.

Gallery

Notes

References
Jean-Paul Chabaud, Joseph-Siffred Duplessis. Un provençal, Peintre du Roi, 2004. With catalogue raisonné and archival material.  
Joseph-Siffred Duplessis The most comprehensive on-line sketch of his career.
(Fine Art Museums of San Francisco) Portrait of a Gentleman (Jean-Baptiste-Francois Dupre?), ca 1779 - 1782. Brief sketch of his career.
(Kunsthistorisches Museum, Vienna) Portrait of Chrisoph Willibald Gluck, 1775
(Louvre Museum) Joseph-Marie Vien, 1782. A repetition, in oil en grisaille on paper (mounted on canvas), is at the Museum of Fine Arts, Boston.
(Metropolitan Museum) Benjamin Franklin, 1778. Shown at the Salon of 1779.
Ministère de la culture: (Louvre Museum, Château de Versailles) Portraits by or attributed to Duplessis

External links 

1725 births
1802 deaths
People from Carpentras
18th-century French painters
French male painters
19th-century French painters
French portrait painters
19th-century French male artists
18th-century French male artists